In mathematics, a solid Klein bottle is a three-dimensional topological space (a 3-manifold) whose boundary is the Klein bottle.

It is homeomorphic to the quotient space obtained by gluing the top disk of a cylinder  to the bottom disk by a reflection across a diameter of the disk.

Alternatively, one can visualize the solid Klein bottle as the trivial product , of the möbius strip and an interval . In this model one can see that 
the core central curve at 1/2 has a regular neighborhood which is again a trivial cartesian product:  and whose boundary is a Klein bottle.

References

3-manifolds